Meeradha is a Bollywood film written and produced by Surya Prakash Jethlia, Executive Producer Pappu Ojha, Rakesh S.P. Srivastava and directed by Aashish Sinha. It features Sandesh Gour, Suhani Jethlia, Venus Jain, K Venkat Ramesh, Anuj Pareek in lead roles. The movie was released on 19 August 2016.

Supporting artists are Pratyush Saxena, Himanshu Goswami, Archit Tak, Akshay.

The movie was declared as Entertainment Tax Exempt on 2 feb, 2017 by Rajasthan Government as the movie beautifully portrayed Rajasthani Culture and solutions to various social problems and myths.

Cast 
 Sandesh Gour as Krishna
 Suhani Jethlia as Radha
 Venus Jain as Meera
 Anuj Pareek as  lakshy
 Dr.Ramesh Joshi as Surgeon

Plot
The plot revolves around the central characters Krishna, Radha and Meera. The story is based on Krishna's life. He is a modern chap who is careless and wastes a lot of time having fun in life. Meera and Radha are his childhood friends. The three re-unite in college, resulting in a love triangle. Beside this conflict, Krishna struggles to fulfill his dad's dream. The movie then shows how Krishna's life takes him on rollercoaster to find closure in his love, passion and dreams.

Crew
 Producer : Surya Prakash Jethlia.
 Director : Aashish Sinha.
 Writer : Surya Prakash Jethlia.
 Co-Writers : Sunil Jethlia, Hemant Badodiya, Suman Tiwary Pathak.
 Music Directors : Archit Tak, Santosh Kumar, Sugat Dhanvijay - Shubham Sundaram.
 Editors : Pravesh Saxena, Lav Singh & Jeet Kumar.
 DOP Cameraman : Vikas Saxena & Jai Nandan Kumar.
 Executive Producers : Pappu Ojha , Rakesh S.P. Srivastava
 Line Producers : P.K. Jain, Ramesh Chandra Laddha & Anil Kumar Jethlia.
 Production Controller : Shubham Jethlia.
 Choreographers : Anup Maheshwari & Prakash Naidu.

Songs
 Romantic Song "Tumhari Chahat" by Shaan.
 Sad Song "Sajna" by Javed Ali.
 Party Song "Jhoom Jhoom Yaara" by Santosh Kumar.
 College Song "Jhamkudi" by Raja Hasan.
 Item Song "Husn Jawaani" by Suhani Jethlia.
 Emotional Song "Oh My Dad" by Shahzad Ali.
 Children Song "Tan Tan Tokri" by Suhani Jethlia, Shreyas Jadhav, Kasturi Belbansi.

Awards
Lead Actor Sandesh Gour got ""Critics Award for Acting"" for his Debut Bollywood Movie Meeradha at DIFF ""Darbhanga International Film Festival 2017"" on 29 January 2017.
Lead Actor Sandesh Gour got ""Jury Award for Acting"" in his Debut Bollywood Movie Meeradha as lead at LCIFF ""Lake City International Film Festival 2017 on 1 April 2017

References 

2016 films
Indian drama films
2016 drama films
2010s Hindi-language films
Hindi-language drama films